Nepal, represented by the Nepal Olympic Committee (NOC), competed at the 2020 Summer Olympics in Tokyo. Originally scheduled to take place from 24 July to 9 August 2020, the Games were postponed to 23 July to 8 August 2021, because of the COVID-19 pandemic. Nepalese athletes have appeared in every Summer Olympics since 1964, with the exception of 1968.

Competitors
The following is the list of number of competitors in the Games.

Athletics

Nepal received a universality slot from the World Athletics to send a female track and field athlete to the Olympics.

Track & road events

Judo

Nepal received an invitation from the Tripartite Commission and the International Judo Federation to send Soniya Bhatta in the women's extra-lightweight category (48 kg) to the Olympics.

Shooting

Nepal received an invitation from the Tripartite Commission to send a women's air rifle shooter to the Olympics, as long as the minimum qualifying score (MQS) was fulfilled by June 5, 2021.

Swimming

Nepal received a universality invitation from FINA to send two top-ranked swimmers (one per gender) in their respective individual events to the Olympics, based on the FINA Points System of June 28, 2021.

See also
List of Olympic athletes of Nepal

References

Nations at the 2020 Summer Olympics
2020
2021 in Nepalese sport